Sea perch, sea-perch or seaperch are the common names of various fishes, including:

 Fishes of the family Sebastidae, especially those of the genus Sebastes (more commonly known as rockfish)
 Caesioperca rasor (also known as barber perch)
 The splendid sea perch
 The red sea perch, Lutjanus argentimaculatus
 The Waigieu seaperch
 The bluestripe snapper,  bluestripe sea perch
 The striped surfperch, Embiotoca lateralis, also called the striped seaperch
 The swallowtail sea perch

See also
SeaPerch, a remotely operated vehicle educational program